Soul food is an ethnic cuisine traditionally prepared and eaten by African Americans, originating in the Southern United States. Soul food originated with the foods that were given to enslaved Black people by white enslavers on Southern plantations during the Antebellum period; however, it was strongly influenced by the traditional practices of West Africans and Southeastern Native Americans from its inception. Due to the historical presence of African Americans in the region, soul food is closely associated with the cuisine of the American South although today it has become an easily identifiable and celebrated aspect of mainstream American food culture.

The expression "soul food" originated in the mid-1960s, when "soul" was a common word used to describe African-American culture.

Origins

Soul food originated in the Deep South, mainly Alabama, Mississippi and Georgia, where there was a large population of enslaved peoples.

The term soul food became popular in the 1960s and 1970s in the midst of the Black Power movement. One of the earliest written uses of the term is found in The Autobiography of Malcolm X, which was published in 1965. LeRoi Jones (Amiri Baraka) published an article entitled "Soul Food" and was one of the key proponents for establishing the food as a part of the black American identity. Those who had participated in the Great Migration found within soul food a reminder of the home and family they had left behind after moving to unfamiliar northern cities. Soul food restaurants were black-owned businesses that served as neighborhood meeting places where people socialized and ate together.

Soul food recipes have pre-slavery influences, as West African and European foodways were adapted to the environment of the region. Many of the foods integral to the cuisine originate from the limited rations given to enslaved people by their planters and masters. Enslaved people were typically given a peck of cornmeal and 3-4 pounds of pork per week, and from those rations come soul food staples such as cornbread, fried catfish, barbecued ribs, chitterlings, and neckbones. It has been noted that enslaved Africans were the primary consumers of cooked greens (collards, beets, dandelion, kale, and purslane) and sweet potatoes for a portion of US history.

Most enslaved people needed to consume a high-calorie diet, to replenish the calories spent working long days in the fields or performing other physically arduous tasks. This led to time-honored soul food traditions like frying foods, breading meats and fishes with cornmeal, and mixing meats with vegetables (e.g. putting pork in collard greens). Eventually, this slave-invented style of cooking was adopted into larger Southern culture, as slave owners gave special privileges to slaves with cooking skills.

Impoverished whites and blacks in the South cooked many of the same dishes stemming from the soul tradition, but styles of preparation sometimes varied. Certain techniques popular in soul and Southern cuisines (i.e., frying meat and using all parts of the animal for consumption) are shared with ancient cultures all over the world, including China, Egypt, and Rome.

Introduction of soul food to northern cities such as Washington D.C. also came from private chefs in the White House. Many American presidents have desired French cooking, and have sought after black Creole chefs. The 23rd President of the United States, Benjamin Harrison, and former First Lady Caroline Harrison, took this same route when they terminated their French cooking staff for a black woman by the name of Dolly Johnson.

One famous relationship includes the bond formed between President Lyndon B. Johnson and Zephyr Wright. Wright became a great influence to Johnson in fighting for civil rights as he saw her treatment and segregation as they would travel throughout the south. Johnson even had Wright present at the signing of several civil rights laws. Lizzie McDuffie, a former maid and cook to Franklin Delano Roosevelt, assisted her boss during the 1936 election simply by making the president more relatable to black voters. With public awareness of black Americans preparing food in the presidential kitchen, this in turn helped to sway minority votes for hopeful presidential candidates such as John F. Kennedy.

Native American influence
Southeastern Native American culture is an important element of Southern cuisine. From their cultures came one of the main staples of the Southern diet: corn (maize), either ground into meal or limed with an alkaline salt to make hominy, in a Native American process known as nixtamalization. Corn was used to make all kinds of dishes, from the familiar cornbread and grits, to liquors such as moonshine and whiskey (which are still important to the Southern economy).

Many fruits are available in this region: blackberries, muscadines, raspberries, and many other wild berries were part of Southern Native Americans' diets, as well.

African, European, and Native Americans of the American South supplemented their diets with meats derived from the hunting of native game. What meats people ate depended on seasonal availability and geographical region. Common game included opossums, rabbits, and squirrels. Livestock, adopted from Europeans, in the form of cattle and hogs, were kept.

When game or livestock was killed, the entire animal was used. Aside from the meat, it was common for them to eat organ meats such as brains, livers, and intestines. This tradition remains today in hallmark dishes like chitterlings (commonly called chit'lins), which are small intestines of hogs; livermush (a common dish in the Carolinas made from hog liver); and pork brains and eggs. The fat of the animals, particularly hogs, was rendered and used for cooking and frying. Many of the early European settlers in the South learned Native American cooking methods, and so cultural diffusion was set in motion for the Southern dish.

African influence 

Scholars have noted the substantial African influence found in soul food recipes, especially from the West and Central regions of Africa. This influence can be seen through the heat level of many soul food dishes, as well as many ingredients found within them. Peppers used to add spice to food included malagueta pepper, as well as peppers native to the western hemisphere such as red (cayenne) peppers. Several foods that are essential in southern cuisine and soul food were domesticated or consumed in the African savanna and the tropical regions of West and Central Africa. These include pigeon peas, black-eyed peas, okra, and sorghum.

It has also been noted that a species of rice was domesticated in Africa, thus many Africans who were brought to the Americas kept their knowledge for rice cooking. Rice is a staple side dish in the Lowcountry region and in Southern Louisiana. Rice is the center of dishes such as jambalaya and red beans and rice which are popular in Southern Louisiana.

There are many documented parallels between the foodways of West Africans and soul food recipes. The consumption of sweet potatoes in the US is reminiscent of the consumption of yams in West Africa. The frequent consumption of cornbread by African-Americans is analogous to West Africans' use of fufu to soak up stews.

West Africans also cooked meat over open pits, and thus it is possible that enslaved Africans came to the New World with knowledge of this cooking technique (it is also possible they learned it from Native Americans, since Native Americans barbecued as a cooking technique).

Researchers state that many tribes in Africa utilized a vegetarian/plant based diet because of its simplicity. This included the way food was prepared as well as served. It was not uncommon to see food served out of an empty gourd. Many techniques to change the overall flavor of staple food items such as nuts, seeds, and rice contributed to added dimensions of evolving flavors. These techniques included roasting, frying with palm oil, baking in ashes, and steaming in leaves such as banana leaf.

Cookbooks

Because it was illegal in many states for slaves to learn to read or write, soul food recipes and cooking techniques tended to be passed along orally, until after emancipation.

The first soul food cookbook is attributed to Abby Fisher, entitled What Mrs. Fisher Knows About Old Southern Cooking and published in 1881. Good Things to Eat was published in 1911; the author, Rufus Estes, was a former slave who worked for the Pullman railway car service. Many other cookbooks were written by black Americans during that time, but as they were not widely distributed, most are now lost.

Since the mid-20th century, many cookbooks highlighting soul food and African-American foodways have been compiled and published. One notable soul food chef is celebrated traditional Southern chef and author Edna Lewis, who released a series of books between 1972 and 2003, including A Taste of Country Cooking in which she weaves stories of her childhood in Freetown, Virginia into her recipes for "real Southern food".

Another early and influential soul food cookbook is Vertamae Grosvenor's Vibration Cooking, or the Travel Notes of a Geechee Girl, originally published in 1970, focused on South Carolina Lowcountry/Geechee/Gullah cooking. Its focus on spontaneity in the kitchen—cooking by "vibration" rather than precisely measuring ingredients, as well as "making do" with ingredients on hand—captured the essence of traditional African-American cooking techniques. The simple, healthful, basic ingredients of lowcountry cuisine, like shrimp, oysters, crab, fresh produce, rice and sweet potatoes, made it a bestseller.

Usher boards and Women's Day committees of various religious congregations large and small, and even public service and social welfare organizations such as the National Council of Negro Women (NCNW) have produced cookbooks to fund their operations and charitable enterprises. The NCNW produced its first cookbook, The Historical Cookbook of the American Negro, in 1958, and revived the practice in 1993, producing a popular series of cookbooks featuring recipes by famous black Americans, among them: The Black Family Reunion Cookbook  (1991), Celebrating Our Mothers' Kitchens: Treasured Memories and Tested Recipes (1994), and Mother Africa's Table: A Chronicle of Celebration (1998).  The NCNW also recently reissued The Historical Cookbook.

Cultural relevance

Soul food originated in the southern region of the US and is consumed by African-Americans across the nation. Traditional soul food cooking is seen as one of the ways enslaved Africans passed their traditions to their descendants once they were brought to the US, and is a cultural creation stemming from slavery and Native American and European influences.

Soul food recipes are popular in the South due to the accessibility and affordability of the ingredients.

Scholars have noted that while white Americans provided the material supplies for soul food dishes, the cooking techniques found in many of the dishes have been visibly influenced by the enslaved Africans themselves. Dishes derived by slaves consisted of many vegetables and grains because slave owners felt more meat would cause the slave to become lethargic with less energy to tend to the crops.

The bountiful vegetables that were found in Africa, were substituted in dishes down south with new leafy greens consisting of dandelion, turnip, and beet greens. Pork, more specifically hog, was introduced into several dishes in the form of cracklins from the skin, pig's feet, chitterlings, and lard used to increase the fat intake into vegetarian dishes. Spices such as thyme, and bay leaf blended with onion and garlic gave dishes their own characteristics.

Figures such as LeRoi Jones (Amiri Baraka), Elijah Muhammad, and Dick Gregory played notable roles in shaping the conversation around soul food. Muhammad and Gregory opposed soul food because they felt it was unhealthy food and was slowly killing African-Americans. They saw soul food as a remnant of oppression and felt it should be left behind. Many African-Americans were offended by the Nation of Islam's rejection of pork as it is a staple ingredient used to flavor many dishes.

Stokely Carmichael also spoke out against soul food, claiming that it was not true African food due to its colonial and European influence. Despite this, many voices in the Black Power Movement saw soul food as something African-Americans should take pride in, and used it to distinguish African-Americans from white Americans. Proponents of soul food embraced the concept of it, and used it as a counterclaim to the argument that African-Americans had no culture or cuisine.

The magazine Ebony Jr! was important in transmitting the cultural relevance of soul food dishes to middle-class African-American children who typically ate a more standard American diet.

Soul food is frequently found at religious rituals and social events such as funerals, fellowship, Thanksgiving, and Christmas in the black community.

Soul food spread throughout the United States when African Americans from the South moved to major cities across the country such as Chicago and New York City. They brought with them the foods and traditions of the Southern United States, where they were enslaved.

Soul food is culturally similar to Romani cuisine in Europe.

Health concerns 

Soul food prepared traditionally and consumed in large amounts can be detrimental to one's health. Opponents to soul food have been vocal about health concerns surrounding the culinary traditions since the name was coined in the mid-20th century.

Soul food has been criticized for its high starch, fat, sodium, cholesterol, and caloric content, as well as the inexpensive and often low-quality nature of the ingredients such as salted pork and cornmeal. In light of this, soul food has been implicated by some in the disproportionately high rates of high blood pressure (hypertension), type 2 diabetes, clogged arteries (atherosclerosis), stroke, and heart attack suffered by African-Americans. Figures who led discussions surrounding the negative impacts of soul food include Dr. Alvenia Fulton, Dick Gregory, and Elijah Muhammad.

On the other hand, critics and traditionalists have argued that attempts to make soul food healthier also make it less tasty, as well as less culturally/ethnically authentic.

There is also often a foundational difference in how health is perceived; soul food may differ from normal understandings in American culture. 

Fueled by federal subsidies, the agricultural system in the United States became industrialized as the nutritional value of most processed foods, and not just those implicated in a traditional perception of soul food, have degraded. This urges a consideration of how concepts of racial authenticity evolve alongside changes in the structures that make some foods more available and accessible than others.

An important aspect of the preparation of soul food was the reuse of cooking lard. Because many cooks could not afford to buy new shortening to replace what they used, they would pour the liquefied cooking grease into a container. After cooling completely, the grease re-solidified and could be used again the next time the cook required lard.

With changing fashions and perceptions of "healthy" eating, some cooks may use preparation methods that differ from those of cooks who came before them: using liquid oil like vegetable oil or canola oil for frying and cooking, and using smoked turkey instead of pork, for example. Changes in hog farming techniques have also resulted in drastically leaner pork, in the 21st and late 20th centuries. Some cooks have even adapted recipes to include vegetarian alternatives to traditional ingredients, including tofu and soy-based analogues.

Several of the ingredients included in soul food recipes have pronounced health benefits. Collard and other greens are rich sources of several vitamins (including vitamin A, B6, folic acid or vitamin B9, vitamin K, and C), minerals (manganese, iron, and calcium), fiber, and small amounts of omega-3 fatty acids. They also contain a number of phytonutrients, which are thought to play a role in the prevention of ovarian and breast cancers.

The traditional preparation of soul food vegetables often consists of high temperatures or slow cooking methods, which can lead the water-soluble vitamins (e.g., Vitamin C and the B complex vitamins) to be destroyed or leached out into the water in which the greens cooked. This water is often consumed and is known as pot liquor. Because it contains micronutrients from the greens cooked in it, pot liquor contributes to the nutritional value of a meal when consumed.

Peas and legumes are inexpensive sources of protein, and they also contain important vitamins, minerals, and fiber.

Dishes and ingredients

See also

 American cuisine
 High on the Hog: How African American Cuisine Transformed America
 Comfort food
 List of American foods
 Cuisine of the Southern United States
 Native American cuisine
 Soul Food Junkies, a documentary
 Louisiana Creole cuisine
 Cajun cuisine
 African cuisine
 Cuisine of New Orleans
 Indigenous cuisine of the Americas
 Black veganism
 West African cuisine
 Ethnic cuisine
 List of cuisines
 Texan cuisine
 Slave health on plantations in the United States#Slave diet
 Romani cuisine 
 Barbecue
 Barbecue in North Carolina
 Barbecue in the United States
 Memphis-style barbecue
 List of American desserts
 List of foods of the Southern United States
 List of American foods
 Cuisine of Houston
 Cuisine of Atlanta
 Cuisine of Kentucky
 Thanksgiving dinner
 Cuisine of Antebellum America
 Mexican-American cuisine
 Cuisine of the Pennsylvania Dutch
 Italian-American cuisine
 Greek-American cuisine
 American Jewish cuisine
 Filipino-American cuisine
 American Chinese cuisine
 Kool-Aid

References

Further reading
Huges, Marvalene H. ''Soul, Black Women, and Food. Ed. Carole Counihan and Penny van Esterik. New York: Routledge, 1997.
Bowser, Pearl and Jean Eckstein, A Pinch of Soul, Avon, New York, 1970
Counihan, Carol and Penny Van Esterik editors, Food and Culture, A Reader, Routledge, New York, 1997
Harris, Jessica, The Welcome Table – African American Heritage Cooking, Simon and Schuster, New York, 1996

Root, Waverley and Richard de Rochemont, Eating in America, A History, William Morrow, New York, 1976
Glenn, Gwendolyn, "American Visions", Southern Secrets From Edna Lewis, February–March, 1997
Puckett, Susan, "Restaurant and Institutions", Soul Food Revival, February 1, 1997

External links

What Mrs. Fisher Knows about Old Southern Cooking

 
African-American cultural history
American cuisine
Cuisine of the Southern United States
Native American cuisine of the Southeastern Woodlands
Native American culture
Native American history
Culture of the Southern United States
Cuisine by ethnicity